Paulus "Paul" Hoekstra (born 30 December 1944) is a Dutch-born, Belgian retired sprint canoeist who was active from the mid-1960s to the mid-1970s. Competing in three Summer Olympics, he won a silver medal in the K-2 1000 m event at Tokyo in 1964. Hoekstra also won two medals at the ICF Canoe Sprint World Championships with a silver (K-2 500 m: 1971 for Belgium) and a bronze (K-1 500 m: 1966 for the Netherlands).

References

Sports-reference.com profile

1944 births
Belgian male canoeists
Canoeists at the 1964 Summer Olympics
Canoeists at the 1968 Summer Olympics
Canoeists at the 1976 Summer Olympics
Dutch male canoeists
Living people
Olympic canoeists of Belgium
Olympic canoeists of the Netherlands
Olympic silver medalists for the Netherlands
Sportspeople from Enschede
Olympic medalists in canoeing
ICF Canoe Sprint World Championships medalists in kayak
Medalists at the 1964 Summer Olympics
20th-century Dutch people
20th-century Belgian people